Elizabeth Wright may refer to:

Elizabeth Wright (artist) (born 1964), English artist
Elizabeth Wright (educator) (1876–1963), founder of Connecticut College
Elizabeth Wright (swimmer) (born 1979), Australian Paralympian
Elizabeth Wright Hubbard (1896–1967), American physician and homeopath
Elizabeth Wright (architect) (1922–2013), American architect; granddaughter of Frank Lloyd Wright
Elizabeth Evelyn Wright (1872–1909), founded Denmark Industrial Institute
Elizabeth Mary Wright (1863–1958), linguist and folklorist
Elizabeth Oehlkers Wright (born 1966), American translator
Betty Wright (1953–2020), American singer
Betsey Wright (born 1943), American activist

See also
Lizz Wright (born 1980), American jazz singer